Tevin may refer to:

Tevin (given name)
Tevin, Kandovan, Iran
Tovin, Kaghazkonan, Iran

See also
Teven (disambiguation)